Emmet (formerly Zen Coding) is a set of plug-ins for text editors that allow for high-speed coding and editing in HTML, XML, XSLT, and other structured code formats via content assist. The project was started by Vadim Makeev in 2008 and continues to be actively developed by Sergey Chikuyonok and Emmet users. Since 2015 Mikael Geletsyan is responsible for UX at Emmet. The tools have been incorporated into several popular text editors, as well as some plug-ins developed by the Emmet team and others implemented independently. However, Emmet is primarily independent from any text editor, as the engine works directly with text rather than with any particular software.

Emmet is open sourced under the MIT License.

Name 
Emmet is a word that originally meant ant, a small insect that can carry over 50 times of its weight. This word is also similar to "emit," which is basically what Emmet does when it expands abbreviations.

Functions

Expand abbreviations 
Emmet uses a specific syntax in order to expand small snippets of code, similar to CSS selectors, into full-fledged HTML code. For example, the sequence

div#page>div.logo+ul#navigation>li*5>a

or

#page>.logo+ul#navigation>li*5>a

expands into

<div id="page">
	<div class="logo"></div>
	<ul id="navigation">
		<li><a href=""></a></li>
		<li><a href=""></a></li>
		<li><a href=""></a></li>
		<li><a href=""></a></li>
		<li><a href=""></a></li>
	</ul>
</div>

The expand abbreviations function includes several other complex functions, such as wrapping a section of code with expanded code.

Tag balancing
The HTML Pair Matcher allows users to locate the matching open/close tag for the tag at the current cursor position. Unlike other HTML pair matchers, Emmet searches from the cursor's current position rather than scanning the document from the beginning.

Text editors
The plug-ins for following text editors were developed by the Emmet team
 Aptana/Eclipse (cross-platform).
 Notepad++ (Windows)
 NetBeans (cross-platform)
 TextMate (Mac)
 Coda (Mac)
 Komodo Edit/IDE (cross-platform)
 PSPad (Windows)
 <textarea> (browser-based)
 Bluefish (Linux/Windows/Mac)
 Brackets (cross-platform)

The following text-editor plug-ins were developed by third-party groups with the official Emmet engine
 Atom (cross-platform)
 Dreamweaver (Windows, Mac)
 Sublime Text (cross-platform)
 Visual Studio (Windows)
 Visual Studio Code (cross-platform)
 gedit (cross-platform)
 AkelPad (Windows)
 UltraEdit (Windows)
 TopStyle (Windows)
 BBEdit/TextWrangler (Mac)
 EmEditor (Windows)

The following text editor plug-ins were developed independently and with a different Emmet engine
 Emacs (cross-platform)
 IntelliJ IDEA/WebStorm/PhpStorm (cross-platform)
 RJ TextEd (Windows)
 Tincta Pro (Mac)
 Vim (cross-platform)

References

External links
 

Application programming interfaces
Software using the MIT license